This is a list of monuments in Parbat District, Nepal as officially recognized by and available through the Department of Archaeology, Nepal.
Parbat is a district of Gandaki Province and is located in central western Nepal.

List of monuments

|}

See also
List of monuments in Nepal
List of monuments in Gandaki Province

References

Parbat